The 2007 Danmark Rundt was a men's road bicycle race held from 1 August to 5 August 2008. It was the 17th edition of the men's stage race, which was established in 1985. The race was won by Norwegian rider Kurt Asle Arvesen of Team CSC. Italian rider Enrico Gasparotto of Team Liquigas finished second by 14 seconds with Dane Matti Breschel of Team CSC third.

Schedule

Teams
Fifteen teams took part in the 2007 race.

Final classifications
Norwegian rider Kurt Asle Arvesen won the race by 14 seconds from Enrico Gasparotto after he won stage 3 on the Kiddesvej climb in Vejle. Dane Matti Breschel came third after having led the race after stages 2, 3 and 4. The victory meant that Arvesen became the first rider to win the Danmark Rundt twice.

The points winner was Mark Cavendish with Jacob Moe Rasmussen the winner of the mountains classification for best climber. Rasmussen was also awarded the fighters award for the race and Gasparotto won the young riders jersey. Team CSC won the overall team competition from Liquigas with Team T-Mobile in third place.

References

Danmark Rundt
Danmark Rundt
Danmark Rundt